Macropophora is a genus of beetles in the family Cerambycidae, containing the following species:

 Macropophora accentifer (Olivier, 1795)
 Macropophora lacordairei Lepesme, 1946
 Macropophora trochlearis (Linnaeus, 1758)
 Macropophora worontzowi Lane, 1938

References

Acanthoderini